William Thomas O'Neil (February 7, 1850 – May 5, 1909) was an American politician from New York.

Biography
William T. O'Neil was born in Brighton, Franklin County, New York on February 7, 1850. He attended the common schools and Fort Edward Collegiate Institute. Then he engaged in the lumber business and farming. He lived in St. Regis Falls, a hamlet in the town of Waverly.

O'Neil was Supervisor of Waverly in 1881; and a member of the New York State Assembly (Franklin Co.) in 1882, 1883, 1884 and 1885.

He was a presidential elector in 1900.

He was a member of the New York State Senate (34th D.) from 1907 until his death in 1909, sitting in the 130th, 131st and 132nd New York State Legislatures. He suffered a stroke, and had to be rolled into the Senate chamber in a wheel-chair in January and February 1909. In March, he became too ill to attend the legislative session, and died on May 5, 1909, at his home in St. Regis Falls.

References

Sources
 Official New York from Cleveland to Hughes by Charles Elliott Fitch (Hurd Publishing Co., New York and Buffalo, 1911, Vol. IV; pg. 315, 317f and 366f)
 Sketches of the Members of the Legislature in The Evening Journal Almanac (1882)

1850 births
1909 deaths
Republican Party New York (state) state senators
People from Brighton, Franklin County, New York
Republican Party members of the New York State Assembly
Town supervisors in New York (state)
1900 United States presidential electors